Tsarev is a rural locality (a selo) and the administrative center of Tsarevskoye Rural Settlement, Leninsky District, Volgograd Oblast, Russia. The population was 1,521 as of 2010. There are 19 streets.

Geography 
Tsarev is located on the left bank of the Akhtuba River, 19 km southeast of Leninsk (the district's administrative centre) by road. Saray is the nearest rural locality.

References 

Rural localities in Leninsky District, Volgograd Oblast